The second legislature of the Rwandan Senate commenced in 2011 and ended in 2019.

The Senate is the upper house of the Parliament of Rwanda (. According to the 2003 Constitution of Rwanda, the Senate includes 26 members:

 12 senators are elected by the councils
 8 senators are appointed by the President
 4 senators designated by the Forum of Political organizations
 1 senator elected by public universities
 1 senator elected by private universities

Members of the Senate

See also 
 First legislature of the Rwandan Senate
 Third legislature of the Rwandan Senate

References

External links 
 Members of the Rwandan Senate at 24th of October, 2018

Parliament of Rwanda
Government of Rwanda
Rwanda
2011 establishments in Rwanda
2019 disestablishments in Rwanda